The 1924–25 Toronto St. Patricks season was Toronto's eighth in the National Hockey League (NH). The St. Pats qualified for the playoffs, finishing second. The St. Pats lost to the Montreal Canadiens in what turned out to be the NHL championship when Hamilton was suspended..

Offseason

Regular season

Final standings

Record vs. opponents

Schedule and results

Playoffs
The St. Pats lost to the third-place Montreal Canadiens in a two-game, total-goals series 5–2. As the Hamilton Tigers went on strike, the Canadiens were named NHL champion.

Montreal wins series 5 goals to two.

Player statistics

Awards and records

Transactions

October 21, 1924: Lost Free Agent Wilf Loughlin to the Regina Capitals (WCHL)
November 12, 1924: Signed Free Agent Reg Reid
December 8, 1924: Signed Free Agent Ernie Parkes
December 8, 1924: Traded Ernie Parkes to the Boston Bruins for cash
December 9, 1924: Signed Free Agent Hap Day
December 14, 1924: Traded Red Stuart to the Boston Bruins for cash
December 17, 1924: Lost Free Agent Stan Jackson to the Boston Bruins
January 14, 1925: Signed Free Agent Mike Neville
February 9, 1925: Signed Free Agent Charlie Cotch

See also
1924–25 NHL season

References

Toronto St. Patricks seasons
Toronto
Toronto